Tricholosporum laeteviolaceum is a species of fungus in the family Tricholomataceae. Found in South Africa, it was described as new to science in 1998.

References

External links

laeteviolaceum
Fungi of Africa
Fungi described in 1998
Taxa named by Derek Reid